MV Cenwulf was one of Wightlink's 'C' class vehicle and passenger ferries on their route from Lymington to Yarmouth on the Isle of Wight.

History
Cenwulf was built in 1973 by Robb Caledon Shipbuilders Ltd in Dundee, Scotland, for Sealink Isle of Wight. The ship was named 'Cenwulf' after Coenwulf of Mercia, an Anglo-Saxon king of the Mercians from 796. Her maiden sailing was on 18 October 1973, when she replaced the 1938-built  on the Lymington to Yarmouth route.

In 1990 ownership passed to Wightlink after the privatisation of Sealink in 1984.

Laid up at Marchwood in 2009,, Cenwulf was sold for scrapping. In March 2010 she was towed to Esbjerg, Denmark. A short time later, she was broken up.

Layout
Above the car deck were passenger accommodation and navigation bridge. Fore and aft ramps allowed full ro-ro operation. In the late 1970s hydraulically operated mezzanine decks were fitted to increase her car capacity.

Service
Cenwulf operated the Lymington to Yarmouth, Isle of Wight ferry service from 1973 to 2009, initially with sister ship Cenred and joined by Caedmon in 1983.

Footnotes

External links
 Wightlink Website - Wightlink.co.uk

Ferries of England
Ferry transport on the Isle of Wight
1973 ships